Vazirabad or Wazirabad may refer to:

Afghanistan 
 Vazirabad, Afghanistan, a village in Balkh Province, Afghanistan
 Wazirabad, Kabul, a neighborhood of Kabul, Afghanistan

Iran 
 Vazirabad, Fars, Iran
 Vazirabad, Ilam, Iran
 Vazirabad, Isfahan, Iran
 Vazirabad, Lorestan, Iran
 Vazirabad, Markazi, Iran
 Vazirabad, West Azerbaijan, Iran

Pakistan 
Wazirabad, a city in Punjab
Wazirabad Tehsil, the administrative subdivision

India 
Wazirabad, Delhi, a village in Delhi, India
Wazirabad, Gurgaon, a village in the Gurgaon district of Haryana, India

Other uses
 Vazirabad (horse)

See also 
 Waziristan